Megacephala laevicollis is a species of tiger beetle in the subfamily Cicindelinae that was described by C.O. Waterhouse in 1880.

References

laevicollis
Beetles described in 1880